Signal Hill-Quidi Vidi is a former provincial electoral district for the House of Assembly of Newfoundland and Labrador, Canada. As of 2011 there were 8,137 eligible voters living within the district.

The district included the east end of the downtown St. John's, and ran north to Newfoundland Drive. The residential mix ranged from apartments and refurbished townhouses in the older part of the city to the edges of suburban subdivisions in the east end.

The last MHA was New Democratic Party MHA, Lorraine Michael. This district was also represented by former Newfoundland and Labrador NDP leader, Jack Harris from 1990 to 2006. The district was abolished in 2015, and became St. John's East-Quidi Vidi.

Members of the House of Assembly
The district has elected the following Members of the House of Assembly:

Results

Signal Hill-Quidi Vidi

 
|NDP
|Lorraine Michael
|align="right"|3,239
|align="right"|65.28
|align="right"|+8.5
|-

|-

|}

|-
 
|NDP
|Lorraine Michael
|align="right"|3,062
|align="right"|56.8
|align="right"|+1.6
 
|Progressive Conservative
|Maria Afonso
|align="right"|2,135
|align="right"|39.6
|align="right"|-5.2

|}

} 
|-
 
|New Democrat
|Lorraine Michael
|align="right"|1,968
|align="right"|55.2
|align="right"| +6.7
 
|Progressive Conservative
|Jerome Kennedy
|align="right"|1,595
|align="right"|44.8
|align="right"| +1.0
|}

|-
 
|New Democrat
|Jack Harris
|align="right"|2,456 
|align="right"|48.5
|align="right"|
 
|Progressive Conservative
|Karen Carroll 
|align="right"|2,221
|align="right"|43.8
|align="right"|

|}

References

External links 
Website of the Newfoundland and Labrador House of Assembly

Newfoundland and Labrador provincial electoral districts
Politics of St. John's, Newfoundland and Labrador